Cikaso Waterfall is a dramatic waterfall on the Cikaso River in Western Java.

Cikaso Waterfall is on the Cikaso River, which originates in North Sukabumi and flows south to the Surade District in  South Sukabumi. It lies in the Ujung tourist area between Jampang Kulon and Surade.
The falls are accessible from the Ciniti, Cibitung village in the Cibitung Kulon sub-Jampang. They can be reached by foot or by  motor boat.

References

Waterfalls of Java
Landforms of West Java
Tourist attractions in West Java